Shennong Mountain lies in the northwest of Qinyang, Henan, China. Its main peak is called "Zijin Ding", which is also known as the "North Peak" (北顶), with an altitude of 1028 meters.

It is said that Shennong, who taught the ancient Chinese the practices of agriculture, was once there to teach farmers recognize different species of plants.

History 
Not only Shennong, but also Laozi who was a mystic philosopher of ancient China, had ever been there. Many great poets such as Han Yu and Li Shangyin had written some poems about Shennong Mountain.

Location 
Its geographical coordinates are approximately 35°11′30″~35°19′N, 112°44′~113°02′E.

References

Mountains of Henan